The Hertfordshire Way is a circular walk around the county of Hertfordshire, England.

The walk is mainly in open countryside, some less than 20 miles from central London, but also passes through the historic city of St Albans, the County town of Hertford and the towns of Royston and Bishop’s Stortford. A number of the smaller, attractive villages of Hertfordshire are also encompassed in the route.

The route is formally divided into 16 sections most of which are accessible using public transport but as a circular walk it can be used to suit the wishes of the walker.

The walk was planned and is cared for by The Friends of the Hertfordshire Way, who are affiliated with the Ramblers Association. Funding for maintenance of way marks etc. is provided through subscriptions and donations to the group and sale of the guidebook.

History 

The route originally started development in 1995 as part of the celebrations to mark 60 years of the Ramblers Association but it was not until 1996 that the route was officially established with the first issue of the guidebook published in 1998. Over subsequent years amendments and additions have been made. A second edition was published in 2009. A third edition was published in 2017 and is available from the Friends of Hertfordshire Way. The third edition builds on the previous editions and makes adjustments to the route to avoid recent housing and highway developments and also to address a small number of access concerns. These changes particularly affect legs 7,8,12 and 13.

Route 

The route starts in North East Hertfordshire at Royston.

Leg 1 

Royston to Wallington. Pasque Flowers can be seen around Easter on Therfield Heath. The route passes through the villages of Therfield, Kelshall and Sandon before arriving at Wallington. Wallington is one of the few places with poor public transport.

Leg 2 

Wallington to Little Wymondley. After passing under the A1M it continues west before turning south through Great Wymondley to finish at Little Wymondley.

Leg 3 

Little Wymondley to Codicote. Soon after the start of this leg there is a difficult crossing of the A602 before heading to Titmore Green. The route continues south through Almshoebury, St Pauls Walden, with connections to Queen Elizabeth the Queen Mother (Bowes-Lyon), and Whitwell before arriving at Codicote.

Leg 4 

Codicote to St Albans. This leg is about  passing through Ayot St. Lawrence and Shaw's Corner (George Bernard Shaw), Wheathampstead, Coleman Green and Sandridge and having skirted the north of St Albans finishes at Verulam Museum illustrating the Roman history of the town.

Leg 5 

St Albans to Markyate. This leg is approximately  via the villages of Redbourn and Flamstead.

Leg 6 

Markyate to Tring Station. The route goes via Great and Little Gaddesden to the National Trust open space of the Ashridge Estate where you have a good chance of seeing fallow deer before descending to Aldbury and Tring Station.

Leg 7 

Tring Station to Kings Langley. This is the longest leg being . The route follows the southern edge of the Ashridge Estate, crosses Berkhamsted common then turns south to Berkhamsted castle then joining the Grand Union Canal to Bourne End. Finally it leaves the Bulbourne valley via a steady climb to reach Bovingdon, Chipperfield and the descent to Kings Langley. This leg can be divided into two shorter sections, typically around Berkhamsted.

Leg 8 

Kings Langley to Shenley. The route remains mainly in open countryside despite its proximity to the M25 corridor and Hemel Hempstead, Watford and St. Albans passing through Abbotts Langley, Aldenham and Letchmore Heath.

Leg 9 

Shenley to Cuffley. The route passes South Mimms and the northern edge of Potters Bar and Northaw to reach Cuffley.

Leg 10 

Cuffley to Hertford. This is the original route of the walk but legs 10A and 10B provide an alternative to Hertford. This leg is just over  almost all in rolling countryside via Newgate Street, Essendon, Little Berkhamsted and Bayford to finish in the County town of Hertford.

Leg 10A 

Cuffley to Broxbourne. This is the first stage of the alternative route to Hertford. The leg is just over  via Goffs Oak and Hammond Street then skirting Hoddesdon in woodland before arriving in Broxbourne.

Leg 10B 

Broxbourne to Hertford. The route starts following the river Lea to Rye House and Stansted Abbotts before briefly entering the Ash valley and then resuming with the river Lea from Great Amwell in to Hertford.

Leg 11 

Hertford to Widford. This route follows three tributaries of the river Lea; the Beane as far as Stapleford, the Rib from Wadesmill to Thundridge and the Ash from Wareside.

Leg 12 

Widford to Bishop’s Stortford. This leg is almost . The route initially follows the river Ash to Much Hadham before heading to Perry Green former home of Henry Moore and then on to Green Tye, Dane Bridge and Bury Green toward the river Stort and Bishop’s Stortford. The walk ends on the outskirts of town.

Leg 13 

Bishop’s Stortford to Hare Street. This leg is a little over  almost all in the open countryside of North East Hertfordshire.It passes Cradle End and Millfield Cottages prior to crossing the A120 at Stone House Farm. It rejoins the original route at Hadham Hall. Finally it passes through Upwick Green, Patmore Heath and Little Hornmead to finish in Hare Street

Leg 14 

Hare Street to Royston. The final leg is  again in open countryside some with long views north as the escarpment is reached and passing the villages of Great Hornmead, Little Hornmead, and Ansty. Approaching Nuthampstead you pass the WW2 airfield and USAF Memorial to 398 squadron before completing the trail at Royston via Barkway and Reed.

Connecting Trails 

The following trails intersect with the Hertfordshire Way:
 Ridgeway National Trail
 Icknield Way
 Hertfordshire Border Walk
 Lea Valley Walk
 Chiltern Way
 Grand Union Canal Walk
 Hertfordshire Chain Walk
 Harcamlow Way

Transport 

The eastern side of the County (Broxbourne, Hertford and Bishops Stortford) are served by rail from London Liverpool Street station. The north east (Royston, Letchworth, Cuffley and Hertford) are served from London Kings Cross or Moorgate. The centre (St Albans) is served by Thameslink from St Pancras whilst the west (Kings Langley, Berkhamsted and Tring) are served from London Euston. Full details of rail services and intermediate stations can be obtained from National Rail.
Details of local bus services can be obtained using either the Intalink  website or both rail and bus via Traveline South East.

Maps 

The route is identified on the following OS Explorer (1:25000) maps: 174; 181; 182; 193; 194;

References

External links
 Ramblers' Association info
 Friends of the Hertfordshire Way

Long-distance footpaths in England
Footpaths in Hertfordshire
County-themed walking routes in the United Kingdom